Sibasa is a village in Limpopo Province, South Africa and the former capital city of the Venda bantustan.  When Venda was declared independent in 1979, the capital was moved to Ṱhohoyanḓou.

Town 72 km north-north-east of Louis Trichardt. It was named after a Venda chief, Tshivhase.

References

Populated places in the Thulamela Local Municipality